Communist League – Politics (KF-p)  was a splinter group of the Communist League (KF) in Denmark.

KF-p gathered around 6% of the delegates at the 1977 KF congress. KF-p was mainly based in the Copenhagen branch of KF. KF-p wanted to maintain that the 1917 October Revolution was the basis of revolution in Denmark.

After departing from KF, KF-p attempted to join the Left Socialists, but were denied entry on grounds of political disagreements.

References

Defunct communist parties in Denmark
Communism in Denmark